Pissy may refer to the following places:

 Pissy, Burkina Faso
 Pissy, Somme, France
 Pissy-Pôville, France